The 2011 Aegon GB Pro-Series Shrewsbury was a professional tennis tournament played on hard courts. It was the fourth edition of the tournament which was part of the 2011 ITF Women's Circuit. It took place in Shrewsbury, Great Britain between 19 and 25 September 2011.

WTA entrants

Seeds

 1 Rankings are as of September 12, 2011.

Other entrants
The following players received wildcards into the singles main draw:
  Yasmin Clarke
  Nicola George
  Heather Watson
  Lisa Whybourn

The following players received entry from the qualifying draw:
  Céline Cattaneo
  Nicola Geuer
  Elixane Lechemia
  Tara Moore

Champions

Singles

 Mona Barthel def.  Heather Watson, 6–0, 6–3

Doubles

 Maria João Koehler /  Katalin Marosi def.  Amanda Elliott /  Johanna Konta, 7–6(7–3), 6–1

External links
Official Website
ITF Search 

Aegon GB Pro-Series Shrewsbury